Pseudodaphnella dichroma is a species of sea snail, a marine gastropod mollusk in the family Raphitomidae.

Description
The length of the shell attains 4.6 mm, its diameter 2 mm.

Distribution
This marine species occurs in the Red Sea

References

 Sturany, R. "Gastropoden des Rothen Meeres. Expeditionen SM Schiff "Pola" in das Rothe Meer 1895/96 und 1897/98." ZooL Ergeb. Wien (1903): 1-75

External links
  Tucker, J.K. 2004 Catalog of recent and fossil turrids (Mollusca: Gastropoda). Zootaxa 682:1-1295.
 Dekker, H.; Orlin, Z. (2000). Check-list of Red Sea Mollusca. Spirula. 47 (supplement): 1-46
 Paolo G. Albano, Piet A.J. Bakker, Ronald Janssen, Anita Eschner, An illustrated catalogue of Rudolf Sturany's type specimens in the Naturhistorisches Museum Wien, Austria (NHMW): Red Sea gastropods; Zoosystematics and Evolution 93(1): 45-94 (18 Jan 2017)

dichroma
Gastropods described in 1903